Glutamate receptor, ionotropic kainate 5 is a protein that in humans is encoded by the GRIK5 gene.

Function 

This gene encodes a protein that belongs to the glutamate-gated ionic channel family. Glutamate functions as the major excitatory neurotransmitter in the central nervous system through activation of ligand-gated ion channels and G protein-coupled membrane receptors. The protein encoded by this gene forms functional heteromeric kainate-preferring ionic channels with the subunits encoded by related gene family members.

Interactions 

GRIK5 has been shown to interact with DLG4 and GRIK2.

See also 
 Kainate receptor

References

Further reading

External links 
 

Ionotropic glutamate receptors